Jonas Tamulis (born March 5, 1958) is a Lithuanian politician. A liberal member of parliament, in 1990 he was among those who signed the Act of the Re-Establishment of the State of Lithuania.
Tamulis served as special guest to the Parliamentary Assembly of the Council of Europe from February 2001 to February 2002.

References

1958 births
Living people
Lithuanian politicians